Brookland is a historic home located near Flat Rock, Henderson County, North Carolina. It was built in 1836, and is a two-story, five bay, double pile, transitional Federal / Greek Revival style roughcast frame dwelling.  The house was updated with Colonial Revival inspired expansions and alterations introduced in the late-19th and early-20th century.

It was listed on the National Register of Historic Places in 1982.

References

Houses on the National Register of Historic Places in North Carolina
Federal architecture in North Carolina
Greek Revival houses in North Carolina
Colonial Revival architecture in North Carolina
Houses completed in 1836
Houses in Henderson County, North Carolina
National Register of Historic Places in Henderson County, North Carolina